Association of Universities Entrusted to the Society of Jesus in Latin America (AUSJAL) (Asociación de Universidades Confiadas a la Compañía de Jesús en América Latina) comprises the thirty-three Jesuit universities in Latin America, from Mexico to Argentina and including the Dominican Republic of the Antilles.

References

Jesuit education
International college and university associations and consortia